Henry Vernon Howell (December 28, 1932 – March 9, 2019) was a Canadian professional hockey player and longtime star for the New York Rangers of the National Hockey League (NHL). He played in the NHL and then the World Hockey Association (WHA) between 1952 and 1976. After his playing career Howell briefly worked as a coach in both leagues, as well as the general manager of the Cleveland Barons in the NHL during the 1977–78 season. He was inducted into the Hockey Hall of Fame in 1979.

Life 
He was born in Hamilton, Ontario and died on March 9, 2019, at the age of 86. He attended GCVI (Guelph Collegiate Vocational Institute), in Guelph, Ontario. Harry was a Westdale Secondary School Alumni. (see Westdale Secondary School). He also played hockey in Guelph.

Career
Howell joined the New York Rangers in 1952. In 1955 he was named captain, but gave up that position after two seasons, as he felt he played poorly those years.

A stalwart, stay at home defenceman, in 1967 Howell was the last player in the pre-expansion era to win the Norris Trophy, and famously said that he was glad he won the trophy then, because Bobby Orr (who finished third that year) would "own" the Norris for some time to come; Orr would win the trophy for the next eight seasons). Howell's playing weight was 195 and he stood 6 foot 1 inches tall. He played seventeen years wearing number 3 for the Rangers. 

In 1969 Howell was offered a front-office position with the Rangers if he retired, but he was interested in still playing, so was sold to the Oakland Seals. He played another eight years in professional hockey; two with Oakland/California Seals, three with the Los Angeles Kings, and one each with three World Hockey Association (WHA) teams:  New York Golden Blades/Jersey Knights (1973–74 WHA season), San Diego Mariners (1974–75), and ending his playing career with the Calgary Cowboys (1975–76).

Howell first moved into team management while still a player. After seven games with the New York Golden Blades, on November 21, 1973, Howell was elevated to player-coach when the team was moved and became the Jersey Knights for the remainder of the season. At the end of that season, the Knights moved and became the San Diego Mariners, with Howell still performing double duty as player-coach. Howell was strictly a player during his season with the Calgary Cowboys.

Howell played 1,411 NHL games and 170 WHA games, scoring 101 goals and 360 assists for 461 points.

He was named a First Team All-Star in 1967, and played in All-Star Games in 1954, 1963, 1964, 1965, 1967, 1968 and 1970. 

When he left the NHL, Howell had played more games as a defenseman than anyone else, and remains sixth in all time games played as a defenseman. He also holds the record for most games played for New York Rangers: 1,160.

After retiring as a player, Howell became general manager of the Cleveland Barons for the 1977–78 NHL season. The Barons were in dire financial circumstances, and merged with the equally challenged Minnesota North Stars at the end of that season. Howell became head coach of the merged Minnesota North Stars for the 1977–78 season, but resigned after only 11 games.

Howell was inducted into the Hockey Hall of Fame in 1979.

In 1990, he won the Stanley Cup as a member of the Edmonton Oilers where he served as a scout. In 2000 he re-joined the Rangers as a scout, and worked in that role until retiring in 2004.

Howell's #3, along with Andy Bathgate's #9, was retired by the New York Rangers on February 22, 2009.

In the 2009 book 100 Ranger Greats, the authors ranked Howell at No. 10 all-time of the 901 New York Rangers who had played during the team's first 82 seasons.

Career statistics

Regular season and playoffs

NHL/WHA Coaching record

Awards and achievements
 1952 - Memorial Cup - (Guelph)
 1967 - James Norris Memorial Trophy
 1989–90 - NHL - Stanley Cup (Edmonton) (as scout)
 Most games played for the New York Rangers (1160)

See also 
List of NHL players with 1,000 games played

References

External links
 
 Anderson, Dave. "Two Rangers Sweaters Will Rise Where a Cup Banner Didn't," The New York Times, Sunday, February 22, 2009.

1932 births
2019 deaths
Calgary Cowboys players
California Golden Seals players
Canada men's national ice hockey team coaches
Canadian ice hockey coaches
Canadian ice hockey defencemen
Cleveland Barons (NHL)
Edmonton Oilers scouts
Guelph Biltmore Mad Hatters players
Hockey Hall of Fame inductees
Ice hockey people from Ontario
James Norris Memorial Trophy winners
Los Angeles Kings players
Minnesota North Stars coaches
Minnesota North Stars scouts
National Hockey League players with retired numbers
Jersey Knights players
New York Golden Blades players
New York Rangers players
New York Rangers scouts
Oakland Seals players
San Diego Mariners players
Sportspeople from Hamilton, Ontario
Stanley Cup champions